Run the Wild Fields is an American drama television movie that premiered in 2000. Released as a Showtime Original Movie, it was based on the play And The Home of the Brave by Rodney Vaccaro.

Premise
A North Carolina woman and her daughter take in a mysterious drifter to work their farm while the woman's husband is missing in action during World War II.

Cast
 Joanne Whalley as Ruby Miller  
 Sean Patrick Flanery as Tom Walker  
 Cotter Smith as Silas Green  
 Alexa Vega as Opal "Pug" Miller  
 Bill Lake as Sheriff Bob
and others.

Awards 
 2001: Daytime Emmy Awards: Outstanding Directing in a Children's Special - Paul A. Kaufman 
 2001: Daytime Emmy Awards: Outstanding Children's Special - Paul Rauch, Paul A. Kaufman, Robert Halmi Jr. and Rodney Patrick Vaccaro
 2001: Daytime Emmy Awards: Outstanding Writing in a Children's Special - Rodney Patrick Vaccaro (Nominated)
 2001: Young Artist Awards: Best Performance in a TV Movie (Drama)-Leading Young Actress - Alexa Vega (Nominated)
 2001: Young Artist Awards: Best Family TV Movie/Pilot/Mini-Series-Cable - Run the Wild Fields(Nominated)

References

External links
 

2000 television films
2000 films
2000 drama films
American drama television films
Films directed by Paul A. Kaufman
2000s English-language films